Ruwenzori may refer to:
 Rwenzori Mountains in Uganda and the Democratic Republic of the Congo 
 Ruwenzori (commune), part of the town of Beni, Nord-Kivu, Democratic Republic of the Congo